Mammoth Lakes is a town in Mono County, California, and is the county's only incorporated community. As of the 2020 United States Census, the population was 7,191, reflecting a 12.7% decrease from the 2010 Census.

History
The Mono people were the first settlers of the Mammoth Lakes area, thousands of years ago. They settled in the valley but traveled by foot to other areas when trading with different tribes.

The European history of Mammoth Lakes started in 1877, when four prospectors staked a claim on Mineral Hill, south of the current town, along Old Mammoth Road. In 1878, the Mammoth Mining Company was organized to mine Mineral Hill, which caused a gold rush. By the end of 1878, 1500 people settled in the mining camp called Mammoth City. By 1880, the company had shut down, and by 1888, the population declined to less than 10 people. By the early 1900s, the town of Mammoth was informally established near Mammoth Creek. The economy of the original town was based on logging and tourism. The first post office at Mammoth Lakes opened in 1923.

In 2004, the Mammoth Ski Museum opened in town. The museum featured many vintage artifacts, photographs, and posters. A movie documenting the life of the founder of the ski resort (Dave McCoy) and those of early famous skiers in the area is shown. In 2010, photographs taken by Dave McCoy were featured in an exhibit at the museum.

In 2008, after a jury trial, the Mono County Superior Court entered a $43 million judgment against the Town of Mammoth Lakes for breach of a development agreement. The California Court of Appeal, Third District, affirmed the judgment in December 2010, and the California Supreme Court declined to hear the appeal on March 23, 2011. On Monday July 2, 2012, Mammoth Lakes filed for bankruptcy in the face of the judgement. Later the same year, the bankruptcy was dismissed as a result of a settlement between the town and its largest creditor.

Geography

Mammoth Lakes lies on the edge of the Long Valley Caldera. The area around the town is geologically active, with hot springs and rhyolite domes that are less than 1000 years old.

Visitors can take State Route 203 from the town of Mammoth Lakes to the Mammoth Mountain Ski Area, over Minaret Summit, then down to Devils Postpile National Monument, with access to the Ansel Adams Wilderness.

The area has natural hot springs which are sometimes used after skiing. Other features include lakes, soda springs, and an obsidian dome. Mammoth Lakes is north of the Owens Valley, a scenic area with extensive hiking opportunities. Lake Mary is south of the town and has recreation facilities.

The town is surrounded by mountains: on the west, Mammoth Mountain looms over the town, while to the south, the Sherwin Range dominates the view. This hilly terrain and the high altitude makes the area great for high-altitude athletic training, including among elite long-distance runners, who live and train in the thin air.

The town is surrounded by acres of forest and is bordered by the Ansel Adams and John Muir Wilderness Areas. The town is situated in the southwestern, mountainous part of Mono County, California.

Climate
Mammoth Lakes has a dry-summer continental climate (Dsb) with long, very snowy winters, and warm, dry summers. On average, there are 21 days of + highs, twenty-one days of highs under  and 4.6 nights of sub- lows annually.

In the wake of the 2022–2023 California floods, Mammoth Lakes was the snowiest place in North America.

Demographics

2020
The 2020 United States Census reported that Mammoth Lakes has a population of 7,191. The racial makeup of Mammoth Lakes was (80.4%) White, (0.9%) African American, (0.3%) Native American, (3.7%) Asian, (0%) Pacific Islander, and (3.7%) from two or more races. Hispanic or Latino of any race were (37.5%).

2019
As of 2019, the United States Census estimated there to be 8,235 residents in Mammoth Lakes.

2010
The 2010 United States Census reported that Mammoth Lakes had a population of 8,234. The racial makeup of Mammoth Lakes was 6,643 (80.7%) White, 29 (0.4%) African American, 49 (0.6%) Native American, 128 (1.6%) Asian, 5 (0.1%) Pacific Islander, 1,151 (14.0%) from other races, and 229 (2.8%) from two or more races. Hispanic or Latino of any race were 2,772 persons (33.7%).

The Census reported that 8,076 people (98.1% of the population) lived in households, 158 (1.9%) lived in non-institutionalized group quarters, and 0 (0%) were institutionalized.

There were 3,229 households, out of which 942 (29.2%) had children under the age of 18 living in them, 1,401 (43.4%) were opposite-sex married couples living together, 177 (5.5%) had a female householder with no husband present, 144 (4.5%) had a male householder with no wife present. There were 293 (9.1%) unmarried opposite-sex partnerships, and 13 (0.4%) same-sex married couples or partnerships. 899 households (27.8%) were made up of individuals, and 153 (4.7%) had someone living alone who was 65 years of age or older. The average household size was 2.50. There were 1,722 families (53.3% of all households); the average family size was 3.14.

The population was spread out, with 1,719 people (20.9%) under the age of 18, 1,050 people (12.8%) aged 18 to 24, 2,833 people (34.4%) aged 25 to 44, 2,100 people (25.5%) aged 45 to 64, and 532 people (6.5%) who were 65 years of age or older. The median age was 32.6 years. For every 100 females, there were 121.4 males. For every 100 females age 18 and over, there were 127.0 males.

The homeowner vacancy rate was 3.4%; the rental vacancy rate was 33.6%. 3,464 people (42.1% of the population) lived in owner-occupied housing units and 4,612 people (56.0%) lived in rental housing units.

2000
As of the census of 2000, there were 7,093 people, 2,814 households, and 1,516 families residing in the town. The racial makeup of the town was 83.21% White, 0.41% African American, 0.49% Native American, 1.27% Asian, 0.13% Pacific Islander, 12.35% from other races, and 2.14% from two or more races. Hispanic or Latino of any race were 22.20% of the population.

There were 2,814 households, out of which 28.4% had children under the age of 18 living with them, 43.3% were married couples living together, 6.0% had a female householder with no husband present, and 46.1% were non-families. 28.3% of all households were made up of individuals, and 2.3% had someone living alone who was 65 years of age or older. The average household size was 2.44 and the average family size was 3.09.

In the town the population was spread out, with 22.5% under the age of 18, 13.3% from 18 to 24, 38.4% from 25 to 44, 21.5% from 45 to 64, and 4.3% who were 65 years of age or older. The median age was 32 years. For every 100 females, there were 131.9 males. For every 100 females age 18 and over, there were 141.2 males.

The median income for a household in the town was $44,570, and the median income for a family was $52,561. Males had a median income of $31,280 versus $25,106 for females. The per capita income for the town was $24,526. About 8.7% of families and 14.4% of the population were below the poverty line, including 14.9% of those under age 18 and none of those age 65 or over.

Economy
Mammoth Lakes' economy is primarily tourism-based. For example, Mammoth Mountain Ski Resort is the top ski destination in California. A 13% tax is added to the rental of any lodging facility and campgrounds for stays of less than a month. There are more than 4,599 rental units in Mammoth Lakes and the lodging industry generates around two-thirds of the gross revenue of the Town of Mammoth Lakes. As well as the pull from winter extreme sports, Mammoth Lakes also benefits greatly from tourism in the summer from people who visit to camp, hike and fish.

The Mammoth Lakes real estate market has gone through ups and downs over the past few decades. In 1980, an earthquake with magnitude of 6.1 on the Richter scale sent area property values plummeting on fears of a potential volcanic eruption similar to the 1980 eruption of Mount St. Helens. A significant real estate surplus formed after this, during which Mammoth Lakes had a total of over 1200 properties on the market. The development of the Mammoth Mountain ski area has had a direct effect on housing in more recent years. The tourist market has led to an explosion of property values. This peaked in 2003 when the median property value reached $750,000. Another peak occurred in 2006 with the sale of the Mammoth Mountain ski area to Starwood Capital Group.
As of August 2022, the median listing price was again $752,000.

Mammoth Lakes is home to Mammoth Brewing Company and Distant Brewing (previously known as Black Doubt Brewing Company.)

Government

The municipal government of Mammoth Lakes is of the council–manager type. The town council consists of five members serving staggered four-year terms. A mayor and a mayor pro tem are selected from town council on an annually rotating basis. Law enforcement is provided by the Mammoth Lakes Police Department and fire protection is provided by the Mammoth Lakes Fire Protection District. Emergency medical service is provided by Mono County operating out of Mammoth Lakes Fire Station #1.

Education
The Mammoth Unified School District includes the following schools: Mammoth Elementary School, Mammoth Middle School, Mammoth High School, Sierra High School, and Mammoth High School ILC.

The Mono County Office of Education offers an alternative high school, the Jan Work Community School, where highly motivated students are allowed to earn credits more quickly than may be earned in a traditional semester.

The Mammoth Lakes Campus of Cerro Coso Community College is also known as the Eastern Sierra College Center. It was established in 1998 and is accredited by the Accrediting Commission for Community and Junior Colleges (ACCJC).

The Mammoth Lakes Library opened in December 2007.

Transportation

Mammoth Lakes receives scheduled passenger airline service seasonally via the Eastern Sierra Regional Airport in Bishop with nonstop regional jet service operated to Los Angeles (LAX), San Francisco (SFO) and Denver (DEN) on United Express operated by SkyWest Airlines. It also has Mammoth Yosemite Airport, which primarily serves general aviation but also has limited scheduled service.

Local and intercity bus service is provided by Eastern Sierra Transit Authority. Yosemite Area Regional Transportation System provides summer bus connections to Yosemite.

In popular culture

Various western films have been shot by Mammoth Lakes. Examples include Thundering Hoofs (1924), The Border Legion (1924), Beyond the Rockies (1932), Flaming Guns (1932), The Trail Beyond (1934), Call of the Wild (1935), Moonlight on the Prairie (1935), King of the Royal Mounted (1936), God's Country and the Woman (1937), Cassidy of Bar 20 (1938), Hawk of the Wilderness (1938), Knights of the Range (1940), Melody Ranch (1940), Sierra Sue (1941), The Return of Frank James (1940), Flame of the Barbary Coast (1945), Frontier Gal (1945), and Rose Marie (1954).

Notable people

John Bachar, deceased 2009, professional rock climber known for free soloing
Josh Cox, former 50k US record holder
Trevor Donovan, actor who played Teddy Montgomery from CW Network's hit series 90210
Trace Gallagher, Fox News anchor and reporter, who grew up in Mammoth Lakes
Bill Green, former United States Record and NCAA record holder in Track and Field, 5th in the hammer throw in the 1984 Summer Olympics
Ryan Hall, runner of the fastest marathon ever by an American, 2:04:58, at the 2011 Boston Marathon
Deena (Drossin) Kastor, 2004 Olympic bronze medalist in the marathon and winner of the London Marathon in 2006
Meb Keflezighi, 2004 Olympic silver medalist in the marathon and winner of the New York City Marathon in 2009 and the Boston Marathon in 2014.
Chloe Kim, Winter X Games snowboarder and 2018 and 2022 Olympic gold medalist.
A total of six Mammoth Lakes residents competed in the 2014 Winter Olympics in Sochi, Russia; Kelly Clark, Greg Bretz, John Teller, Trevor Jacob and Stacey Cook represented the U.S. while Kaya Turski represented Canada.

See also

 List of lakes in California
 Convict Lake

References

External links

Official Tourism Website of the Mammoth Lakes Visitors Bureau

Cities in Mono County, California
Incorporated cities and towns in California
Populated places in the Sierra Nevada (United States)
Government units that have filed for Chapter 9 bankruptcy
Populated places established in 1984
1984 establishments in California